José C. Ferrer (born March 31, 1964 in San Juan, Puerto Rico) is a Puerto Rican jockey in Thoroughbred horse racing. He began riding in the United States in 1983 at Calder Race Course in Florida then at Monmouth Park and the Meadowlands Racetrack in New Jersey. On November 24, 1983 Ferrer became the first jockey to win five races on a single card at the Meadowlands. 

José Ferrer was married for a time to jockey Rosemary Homeister, Jr.

José reached the 4,000-win milestone Feb. 14, 2016 at Tampa Bay Downs.

In 2018 José Ferrer was voted the George Woolf Memorial Jockey Award, a prestigious honor voted on by thoroughbred horse racing jockeys in North America. It is given to a jockey who has demonstrated high standards of personal and professional conduct, on and off the racetrack.

Year-end charts

References

 Jose Ferrer's profile at Tampa Bay Downs

1964 births
Living people
American jockeys
Puerto Rican jockeys